A modern bow saw is a metal-framed crosscut saw in the shape of a bow with a coarse wide blade. This type of saw is also known as a Swede saw, Finn saw or bucksaw. The name 'Swede saw' probably derived from the ovate metal tubular frame version, invented in the 1920s by the Swedish company Sandvikens Jernverk, and additional patents by two Swedish immigrants to the US. Modern versions all share those common features.

Traditionally, a bow saw is a woodworking tool used for straight or curved cuts. A bow saw is a type of frame saw. Its thin blade is held in tension by a frame. In English and American vocabulary it denotes a toothed blade suspended between two long narrow handles called "cheeks" that are supported and separated by a thin stretcher in the center of the handles, making a wide H shape (the cheeks form the uprights of the H, the stretcher the crossbar of the H). The blade is kept in tension with a turnbuckle or a twisted cord that runs parallel to the blade between the two cheeks but on the opposite side of the stretcher. If a cord is used, the cord is twisted with a toggle attached to one loop of the cord, adding tension. The toggle hits the stretcher, which keeps the cord from untwisting. In this context it is also known as a turning saw, which is larger than a coping or fret saw.

The bow saw was used both in ancient China and the Hellenistic period, and developed from earlier saws.

The term 'bow saw' has also been applied to a type of chainsaw with a large, circular guide bar.

See also
 Hacksaw

References

External links
  A tool company's article on bow saw design
 DIY bow saw design
 A 1920s bow saw design 
 A bushcraft bow saw tutorial
 American Bucksaws Reference Publications
 , Bow Saw

Saws
Woodworking hand tools
Swedish inventions